Dale is a small lunar impact crater located in the far eastern part of the Moon's near side, to the south of the Mare Smythii. It lies to the southeast of the larger crater Kastner and northeast of Ansgarius. The crater is located in a part of the lunar surface that is subject to libration, which can hide it from view for periods of time.

It is a relatively shallow and insignificant crater formation with a somewhat eroded outer rim. A smaller crater lies across the south-southwestern rim, creating a break into the interior. The rim is somewhat lower along the north edge than elsewhere, and the feature is marked only by a few tiny craterlets.

References

 
 
 
 
 
 
 
 
 
 
 
 

Impact craters on the Moon